Mohammad Alikhani (also Romanized as Moḩammad ‘Alīkhānī; also known as Chaleh-ye Moḩammad ‘Alī Khānī and Moḩammad ‘Alīkhān) is a village in Hasanabad Rural District, in the Central District of Eslamabad-e Gharb County, Kermanshah Province, Iran. At the 2006 census, its population was 344, in 65 families.

References 

Populated places in Eslamabad-e Gharb County